{{Infobox lake
 | name = Lake Homs
 | native_name        = 
 | other_name         = Lake Qattinah | image =Lake Homs Satellite.png
 | caption =Satellite image of Lake Homs
 | image_bathymetry =
 | caption_bathymetry =
 | location = Homs Governorate
 | coords = 
 | type = Reservoir
 | inflow = Orontes River
 | outflow = Orontes River
 | catchment =
 | basin_countries = Syria
 | length =
 | area = 
 | depth =
 | max-depth =
 | volume =
 | residence_time =
 | shore =
 | elevation =
 | cities = Homs

| pushpin_map             = Syria
| pushpin_label_position  = 
| pushpin_map_alt         = 
| pushpin_map_caption     = 
}}Lake Homs (also called Lake Qattinah''') is a lake near Homs, Syria, fed by the Orontes River.

The lake is artificial, created by the Lake Homs Dam at its northern end. The dam's original structure was one of the most visible works of ancient engineering in Syria and in the Fertile Crescent. Built by the ancient Romans, the dam had created a reservoir whose water was conducted to nearby fields through a network of canals.

References

Bibliography
 

Homs
Homs
Orontes basin